Tom Lawson (born September 15, 1979) is a Canadian former professional ice hockey goaltender. He has since served as a goaltending coach at St. Andrew's College.

Playing career
Born in Whitby, Ontario, Lawson attending Henry Street High School and played junior hockey for the Markham Waxers hockey organization in 1998-99. He then joined Bowling Green State in Ohio and played for the hockey team on a scholarship as a freshman during the 1999–2000 season. He turned professional the next year with the Knoxville Speed of the United Hockey League and made his American Hockey League debut in a single contest with the Cincinnati Mighty Ducks.

In the 2002–03 season, Lawson was the starting goaltender for the Fort Wayne Komets and recorded a banner year in claiming the UHL Championship. He was selected as the league's best goaltender, playoff MVP and earning a place in the UHL First-All-Star Team. In the off-season, Lawson was signed to a NHL contract by the Colorado Avalanche.

Lawson was assigned to the Avalanche's AHL affiliate, the Hershey Bears for the 2003–04 season. He appeared in a career high 32 AHL games for 13 wins and a 2.30 goals against average. He would remain within the Avalanche affiliations for the next two seasons with the Bears and the Lowell Lock Monsters.

In the 2006–07 season, Lawson embarked on pursuing a European career and signed a one-year deal with Lukko Rauma in the Finnish SM-liiga. He then moved to Russia, signing as the starting goaltender for the 2007–08 season with CSKA Moscow (the "Red Army Team") of the Russian Superleague. Becoming the first Canadian to feature in goal for the Red Army, Lawson led the RSL in wins, shutouts and games played.

After his successful stint with the Red Army, Lawson signed a two-year contract with Sibir Novosibirsk for the inaugural season of the new top level Russian tier, the Kontinental Hockey League (KHL). Lawson appeared in 59 games in the KHL over his two seasons with Novosibirsk before he was released by the club on January 15, 2010. Nearing the end of the 2009–10, on January 26, 2010, he moved to Sweden to finish his professional career with Leksands IF of the second tier HockeyAllsvenskan.

Personal
Lawson has a wife and three kids, and resides in Aurora, Ontario. Post playing career he became a fire-fighter for the town of Ajax, Ontario while owning and running a development hockey program, Lawson Goaltending Hockey School. He serves as the goalie coach to St. Andrew's College Varsity hockey team in Aurora. His brother-in-law is former professional hockey player, Ryan Murphy. He is also a part of the Murphy Hockey School program.

Career statistics

Awards and honours

References

External links

1979 births
Living people
Anchorage Aces players
Bowling Green Falcons men's ice hockey players
Canadian ice hockey goaltenders
Cincinnati Mighty Ducks players
HC CSKA Moscow players
Fort Wayne Komets players
Hershey Bears players
Knoxville Speed players
Leksands IF players
Lowell Lock Monsters players
Lukko players
Reading Royals players
San Diego Gulls (ECHL) players
HC Sibir Novosibirsk players
Canadian expatriate ice hockey players in Finland
Canadian expatriate ice hockey players in Russia
Canadian expatriate ice hockey players in Sweden